Carlos Cazorla Medina (born December 7, 1977, in Las Palmas de Gran Canaria) is a retired Spanish basketball player, playing the small forward position.

Clubs 
 Saski Baskonia –  ACB (Spain) – 1993–1998
 Baloncesto Fuenlabrada – ACB (Spain) – 1998–2002
 Caja San Fernando – ACB (Spain) – 2002–2007
 ViveMenorca – ACB (Spain) – 2007–2008
 CB Lucentum Alicante – LEB Oro (Spain) – 2008–2009
 Meridiano Alicante – ACB (Spain) – 2009–2011

References 

1977 births
Living people
Baloncesto Fuenlabrada players
CB Lucentum Alicante players
Real Betis Baloncesto players
Menorca Bàsquet players
Liga ACB players
Saski Baskonia players
Spanish men's basketball players
Sportspeople from Las Palmas
Mediterranean Games gold medalists for Spain
Mediterranean Games medalists in basketball
Competitors at the 2001 Mediterranean Games
Small forwards